Kathi is a 1983 Indian Malayalam film, directed by V. P. Mohammed. The film stars M G Soman, Seema, Venu Nagavally, and Menaka Jalaja in the lead roles. The film has musical score by M. B. Sreenivasan.

Cast
MG Soman
Seema
Venu Nagavally
Menaka (actress)
Jalaja

Soundtrack
The music was composed by M. B. Sreenivasan and the lyrics were written by O. N. V. Kurup.

References

External links
 

1983 films
1980s Malayalam-language films